Faristenia kanazawai is a moth in the family Gelechiidae. It is found in Japan (Honshu).

The length of the forewings is 6.6–7 mm. The forewings are white, tinged with brownish grey except for the costa. There is a blackish dot on the costa at the base, as well as five blackish marks. A blackish dot is found on the subcostal near the base and there is a blackish elliptical mark above the tornus. The plical fold has a fuscous dot at two-seventh and there is an irregular fuscous streak from before the middle to the tornus, as well as a fuscous dot on the dorsal margin at one-seventh and a series of obscure fuscous dots on the costal margin and termen. The hindwings are pale brownish grey.

References

Faristenia
Moths described in 2000